The U Sports Men's Volleyball Player of the Year is awarded annually to the men's volleyball player of the year in U Sports (previously named Canadian Interuniversity Sport). No player has won the award more than twice and only two players have accomplished the feat (Terry Danyluk in 1980 and 1981; Darcy Busse in 1984 and 1986). The Alberta Golden Bears program has featured the most winners with ten and nine of those recipients were either coached by Danyluk or were Danyluk himself. Following the cancellation of the 2020-21 season due to the COVID-19 pandemic, there was no award winner in 2021.

List of winners

References

External links
 

U Sports trophies
U Sports volleyball